Ruellia pedunculata, the stalked wild petunia, is a wild petunia with blue or violet flowers that appear in the spring. Its leaves are light green. This species is native to the southeastern United States.

References

pedunculata
Flora of the Southeastern United States
Flora without expected TNC conservation status